Lioi is a surname. Notable people with the surname include:

Andrés Lioi (born 1997), Argentine football midfielder 
Sara Elizabeth Lioi (born 1960), United States District Judge